Kotapally is a Mandal of Mancherial district in Telangana state of India.

Administrative Division 
There are 34 Villages in the Kotapally.

References 

Villages in Mancherial district
Mandal headquarters in Mancherial district